Germany (officially the Federal Republic of Germany) is a European country.

Germany may also refer to:

Other political entities
 Historical entities:
 Kingdom of Germany (medieval)
 Holy Roman Empire (800/962–1806)
 Confederation of the Rhine, Napoleonic alliance (1806–1813)
 German Confederation, Confederation of German-speaking states (1815–1848), (1850–1866)
 German Empire (1848–1849)
 North German Confederation (1867–1870)
 German Empire (1871–1918)
 Weimar Republic (1918–1933)
 Nazi Germany (1933–1945)
 West–East division (1945–1990):
 West Germany, officially the Federal Republic of Germany
 East Germany, officially the German Democratic Republic
 Germany (European Parliament constituency), the constituency for the election of the European Parliament

People
 Germany Schaefer (1876–1919), Major League Baseball player
 Germany Schulz (1883–1951), All-American football player for the University of Michigan
 Germany Smith (1863–1927), Major League Baseball player
 Jim Germany (born 1953), Canadian Football League player
 Reggie Germany (born 1978), National Football League player
 Willie Germany (born 1948), National Football League player
 nickname of Maurice E. Curts (1898–1976), United States Navy four-star admiral and commander-in-chief of the United States Pacific Fleet

Places in the United States
 Germany, Indiana, a community in the United States
 Germany, Texas, a community in the United States
 Germany Township, Adams County, Pennsylvania, a township in the United States
 Germany Valley, West Virginia
 Germany Valley (Georgia)

Other uses
 Germany (horse) (1991–2013), a thoroughbred racehorse

See also
 Names of Germany
 German (disambiguation)
 Germania (disambiguation)
 Deutschland (disambiguation) – where Deutschland is the German word for "Germany"